Calvin Carl "Kelly" Gotlieb,  (March 27, 1921 – October 16, 2016) was a Canadian professor and computer scientist who has been called the "Father of Computing" in Canada. He was a Professor in Computer Science at the University of Toronto.

Biography 

He received a Bachelor of Science in physics in 1942, a Master of Arts in 1944 and a Ph.D. in 1947 from the University of Toronto.

In 1948, he co-founded the computation centre at the University of Toronto and was part of the first team in Canada to build computers and to provide computing services. In 1950, he created the first university course on computing in Canada and in 1951 offered the first graduate course. In 1964, he helped to found the first Canadian graduate department of computer science at the University of Toronto.

In 1958, he helped to found the Canadian Information Processing Society and was its president from 1960 to 1961.

In 1995, he was made a Member of the Order of Canada. He was a Fellow of the Royal Society of Canada and in 2006, a founding Fellow of the Canadian Information Processing Society. In 1994, he received the International Federation for Information Processing Isaac L. Auerbach Award and was inducted as a Fellow of the Association for Computing Machinery.

He was married to Phyllis Bloom, a Canadian science fiction novelist and poet, from 1949 until her death in 2009. Kelly and Phyllis Gotlieb had three children: son Leo Gotlieb; daughters Margaret Gotlieb and Jane Lipson.

Kelly Gotlieb died on October 16, 2016 in Toronto.

References

External links
 
 Calvin Carl Gotlieb at The Canadian Encyclopedia
 Prof. Gotlieb, Classified Work interview with, Stephen Ibaraki
 Prof. Gotlieb, Pioneer in Computing Profile by, Stephen Ibaraki
 Prof. Gotlieb, International Science and Engineering Fair interview with, Stephen Ibaraki
 Prof. Gotlieb, Security Trumps Privacy interview with, Stephen Ibaraki
 Prof. Gotlieb, Skills Shortage interview with, Stephen Ibaraki
 Prof. Gotlieb, Evolution of Computers interview with, Stephen Ibaraki
 Prof. Gotlieb, Foundational work with the ACM interview with, Stephen Ibaraki
 Prof. Gotlieb, IFIP and CIPS interview with, Stephen Ibaraki
Calvin Gotlieb archival papers held at the University of Toronto Archives and Records Management Services

1921 births
2016 deaths
Canadian computer scientists
Fellows of the Association for Computing Machinery
Fellows of the Royal Society of Canada
Members of the Order of Canada
Scientists from Toronto
University of Toronto alumni
Academic staff of the University of Toronto